Black River is a small community just outside Saint John on Route 825 in the Canadian province of New Brunswick. There are 2 other communities in New Brunswick with the same name.

History

Notable people

See also
List of communities in New Brunswick

References

Communities in Saint John County, New Brunswick